Nedžad Branković  (born 28 December 1962, Višegrad, Yugoslavia) is a Bosnian politician. He was the  premier of the Federation of Bosnia and Herzegovina from March 2007 until resigning in May 2009.

Controversies

The Center for Investigative Reporting - Bosnia-Herzegovina looked at how Branković was able to earn a practically free apartment from the government of Bosnia in an article titled " A Lucky Real Estate Deal."  They also chronicled his conflicts of interest in his ownership of a privatization fund management firm in an article titled " Slovenian Company Pushes Out Bosnian Owners and Investors ." 

Branković has also been condemned for selling debts owed to Bosnia by the Democratic Republic of Congo to a FG Hemisphere. Bosnian police claimed Branković acted illegally in selling the debt, which was owned by the country, but sold personally, and recommended he be charged. No charges have been brought.

References

External links
Mustafa Mujezinović

1962 births
Living people
People from Višegrad
Bosniaks of Bosnia and Herzegovina
University of Sarajevo alumni
Party of Democratic Action politicians
Politicians of the Federation of Bosnia and Herzegovina
Prime ministers of the Federation of Bosnia and Herzegovina